is a Japanese manga artist. Fujiwara first came to attention by winning the 1984 Shogakukan New Artist Award for Maris. He worked as Ryoichi Ikegami's assistant until 1986, and his artistic style closely resembles that of his master.

In 1986 he made his formal debut with Shiritsu Shuuten Koukou.

Works 

  (written by Kōichi Kitamura)
  (written by Matsuda Ryuchi)
  (written by Kyoichi Nanatsuki)
  (written by Kyoichi Nanatsuki)
  (written by Kichiro Nabeta)
  (written by Kyoichi Nanatsuki)
  (written by Kyoichi Nanatsuki)

External links
 

1966 births
Living people
Manga artists from Tottori Prefecture